Elections in the Republic of India in 1993 included elections to nine state legislative assemblies and to seats in the Rajya Sabha.

Legislative Assembly elections

Delhi

Himachal Pradesh

Madhya Pradesh

Source:

Meghalaya

Mizoram

Nagaland

Rajasthan

Source:

Tripura

Source:

Uttar Pradesh

Source:

Rajya Sabha

References

External links
 

1993 elections in India
India
1993 in India
Elections in India by year